Jean-François Rischard (born 2 October 1948) is an economist, and was the first European Vice President of the World Bank from 1998 to 2005.  He lives in Paris, France.

Early years
Rischard was born in Luxembourg to Charles-Edouard Rischard and Huguette Navereau. He attended the University of Aix-Marseille where he received both a graduate and doctoral degree in Economics. Rischard also has a doctorate in Law from the University of Luxembourg, and a Master's in Business Administration from Harvard Business School.

Career
Rischard joined the World Bank Group in 1975. In 1976 he became a project officer in the Industrial Projects Department and In 1982 he joined the Financial Policy and Analysis Department as a Senior Financial Analyst. In 1986 to join the Wall Street firm of Drexel Burnham Lambert as a Senior Vice-President for International Fixed Income markets.

Publications 
 High Noon 20 Global Problems, 20 Years to Solve Them (2003). .

References 
 

Luxembourgian bankers
Luxembourgian economists
Harvard Business School alumni
World Bank people
1948 births
Living people
Fellows of the Econometric Society